Billy King may refer to:

 Billy King (sportsman) (1902–1987), Irish cricketer and Singaporean rugby union player
 Billy King (Australian footballer) (1920–1990), Australian rules footballer
 Billy King (basketball) (born 1966), American basketball player and general manager
 Billy King (footballer, born 1994), Scottish footballer (St Patrick's Athletic F.C.)
 Billy King (vaudeville) (1867–1951/75–1951), American vaudeville entertainer and showman
 Robin King (born 1966), Northern Irish paramilitary nicknamed "Billy"

See also
 Bill King (rugby) (disambiguation)
 William King (disambiguation)